Phil Anthony Yeboah-Kodie (born January 22, 1971, in Ghana) is a former Canadian American football linebacker in the National Football League (NFL) for the Washington Redskins, Carolina Panthers, and Indianapolis Colts. He played college football at Penn State University and was drafted in the fifth round of the 1995 NFL Draft by the Denver Broncos with the 146th overall pick.

External links
 

1971 births
Living people
American football linebackers
Washington Redskins players
Indianapolis Colts players
Penn State Nittany Lions football players
Canadian players of American football